"El Malo" is the fifth single released from Aventura's fifth and final studio album The Last (2009). The single was released on March 11, 2010 and reached #1 on Tropical Airplay. A remix was made with Sensato.

Chart performance
At the time El Malo was released, the previous single by Aventura, Dile al Amor had dominated the charts in early 2010. El Malo was later re-released in mid-2010 where it peaked #2 on the Latin Tropical Airplay chart twice on July 10 and July 24 where the #1 position was being held off by Juan Luis Guerra's Bachata en Fukuoka. The single finally reached #1 on the Latin Tropical Airplay on the week of August 28, 2010. The single has also reached on the Top 10 on Top Latin Songs peaking at #5.

Charts

Weekly charts

Year-end charts

References

2009 songs
2010 singles
Aventura (band) songs
Music videos directed by Jessy Terrero
Songs written by Romeo Santos